Chief Whip is a Member of the parliament of Bangladesh from the ruling party who is responsible for the maintenance of party discipline.

List of Chief Whips
Shah Moazzem Hossain
Abul Hasanat Abdullah
T.I.M. Fazlay Rabbi Chowdhury
M. A. Sattar
Khandaker Delwar Hossain
Khandaker Delwar Hossain
Abul Hasnat Abdullah
Khandaker Delwar Hossain
Md. Abdus Shahid
A. S. M. Feroz
Noor-E-Alam Chowdhury Liton

References

Parliament of Bangladesh
Political whips
Political office-holders in Bangladesh
Lists of political office-holders in Bangladesh